Michael Waylon Lowe (born October 31, 1980) is an American mixed martial artist who most recently competed in the Lightweight division. A professional competitor since 2006, he has competed for the UFC, Bellator MMA, and the World Series of Fighting.

Amateur wrestling career
Lowe was a two-time state finalist and one-time state champion for Jefferson County High School in Dandridge, Tennessee before wrestling for the University of Findlay in Findlay, Ohio.  Lowe recorded 112 victories during his collegiate career.  He was the school's first NCAA national champion in any sport when he captured the 149 lbs national title in 2002.  He won two other NCAA Division II crowns, one at 149 lbs in 2003 and another at 165 lbs in 2004.  In 2004, he faced off with Shawn Silvis in the finals who also was a two-time national champion.  Lowe won the match 8-6 and also won the Outstanding Wrestling award for the tournament.  Lowe ranks 4th in career wins, 1st in season wins, 2nd in career takedowns, and 6th in season takedowns for the University of Findlay.  In 2013, he joined the advisory board for Wrestler Supply, an online e-commerce site for high-end wrestling gear.

Mixed martial arts career
Lowe's interest in MMA sparked while he was training at the Olympic Training Center in Colorado Springs, Colorado. He was only there to train in wrestling, but he had the opportunity to briefly speak with Matt Lindland. Lindland was so influential that Lowe flew out to Oregon to train with Lindland and Randy Couture.

Lowe held only a 1-0 amateur record before his team, Team Gurgel and Team Vision, requested he go pro. Lowe's professional debut was against David Love at a local Hook 'N' Shoot event. Lowe lost the fight after he tapped out from a guillotine choke. He bounced back from the loss with two submission wins, improving his record to 2-1.

In 2007, he lost to the more experienced Alonzo Martinez via submission from punches in the first round. Lowe racked up three wins before trying out for the ninth season of the Ultimate Fighter reality show. Lowe was selected as one of the contestants and brought in for the show. Before he could move in the TUF house, Lowe had to fight Santino DeFranco. After an impressive first round, which Dana White believed should not have gone to a second round because of the beating Lowe delivered to DeFranco, Lowe was defeated by submission early in the second round.

Lowe took about five months off after losing on the Ultimate Fighter show, but then returned to fight for Bellator Fighting Championships. At Bellator 5, Lowe defeated Frank Caraballo via unanimous decision. In April 2010, Lowe defeated UFC veteran Steve Berger via KO midway through round one.

Ultimate Fighting Championship
Lowe made his UFC debut stepping in for Thiago Tavares against Melvin Guillard on May 29, 2010, at UFC 114. Guillard won the fight via KO due to a knee to the body as Lowe was attempting a takedown in the first round.

Lowe fought Steve Lopez on September 25, 2010, at UFC 119. Lowe defeated Lopez via split decision earning his first UFC victory.

On January 22, 2011, at UFC Fight Night 23, Lowe fought former Shooto welterweight champion, Willamy Freire. Lowe won the fight via unanimous decision after dominating his opponent with superior wrestling and effective ground and pound.

Lowe lost to Nik Lentz on March 26, 2011, at UFC Fight Night 24. After Lowe won the first and second rounds convincingly, Lentz came back in the third and scored an impressive come-from-behind submission win.

Following his loss to Lentz, Lowe was subsequently released from the promotion.

Pro Elite
Lowe signed with ProElite in October 2011. He made his Pro Elite debut against Floyd Hodges at ProElite: Big Guns. Lowe won via TKO (doctor stoppage) at 5:00 of the second round.

World Series of Fighting
Lowe made his WSOF debut at World Series of Fighting 2 where he defeated Cameron Dollar by knockout.

For his second fight with the promotion, Lowe appeared on the main card in a fight against Georgi Karakhanyan at World Series of Fighting 5 on September 14, 2013.  He lost the fight via submission in the first round.

XFC Brazil
Lowe made his XFC Brazil debut, when he faced Marcos dos Santos at XFC International 4 on April 26, 2014. After three close rounds, Lowe would lose via split decision. However, following the fight, the result would later be turned to a no contest.

In his next fight in the organization, Lowe faced Deivison Ribeiro for the XFC Featherweight Championship at XFC International 6 on September 27, 2014. He lost the fight via TKO in the fourth round.

Return to Bellator
Lowe faced Ryan Quinn at Bellator 140 on July 17, 2015. He lost the fight by submission in the second round.

Mixed martial arts record 

|-
| NC
| align=center| 16–7 (2)
| Ashleigh Grimshaw
| No Contest
| Art of War 17
| 
| align=center| 1
| align=center| 1:23
| Beijing, China
| 
|-
| Win
| align=center| 16–7 (1)
| Vaso Bakočević
| Decision (unanimous)
| Abu Dhabi Warriors 3
| 
| align=center| 3
| align=center| 5:00
| Abu Dhabi, United Arab Emirates
|
|-
| Loss
| align=center| 15–7 (1)
| Ryan Quinn
| Submission (guillotine choke)
| Bellator 140
| 
| align=center| 2
| align=center| 2:47
| Uncasville, Connecticut, United States
|
|-
| Win
| align=center| 15–6 (1)
| Mateusz Teodorczuk
| Decision (unanimous)
| Abu Dhabi Warriors 2
| 
| align=center| 3
| align=center| 5:00
| Abu Dhabi, United Arab Emirates
|
|-
| Loss
| align=center| 14–6 (1)
| Deivison Ribeiro
| TKO (head kick and punches)
| XFC International 6
| 
| align=center| 4
| align=center| 0:11
| Araraquara, Brazil
| 
|-
| NC
| align=center| 14–5 (1)
| Marcos dos Santos
| No Contest
| XFC International 4
| 
| align=center| 3
| align=center| 5:00
| São Paulo, Brazil
| 
|-
| Loss
| align=center| 14–5
| Georgi Karakhanyan
| Submission (guillotine choke)
| World Series of Fighting 5
| 
| align=center| 1
| align=center| 3:37
| Atlantic City, New Jersey, United States
| 
|-
| Win 
| align=center| 14–4
| Cameron Dollar
| KO (punch)
| World Series of Fighting 2
| 
| align=center| 1
| align=center| 2:58
| Atlantic City, New Jersey, United States
| 
|-
| Win 
| align=center| 13–4
| Mike Diggs
| TKO (punches)
| Pure MMA 2: Next Episode
| 
| align=center| 2
| align=center| 3:13
| Wilkes-Barre, Pennsylvania, United States
| 
|-
| Win 
| align=center| 12–4
| Tim Wadsworth
| KO (punch)
| Instinct MMA: Instinct Fighting 2
| 
| align=center| 1
| align=center| 2:51
| Quebec City, Quebec, Canada
| 
|-
| Win
| align=center| 11–4
| Floyd Hodges
| TKO (doctor stoppage) 
| ProElite: Big Guns
| 
| align=center| 2
| align=center| 5:00
| Moline, Illinois, United States
| 
|-
| Loss
| align=center| 10–4
| Nik Lentz
| Submission (guillotine choke)
| UFC Fight Night: Nogueira vs. Davis
| 
| align=center| 3
| align=center| 2:24
| Seattle, Washington, United States
| 
|-
| Win
| align=center| 10–3
| Willamy Freire
| Decision (unanimous)
| UFC: Fight For The Troops 2
| 
| align=center| 3
| align=center| 5:00
| Fort Hood, Texas, United States
| 
|-
| Win
| align=center| 9–3
| Steve Lopez
| Decision (split)
| UFC 119
| 
| align=center| 3
| align=center| 5:00
| Indianapolis, Indiana, United States
| 
|-
| Loss
| align=center| 8–3
| Melvin Guillard
| TKO (knee to the body)
| UFC 114
| 
| align=center| 1
| align=center| 3:28
| Las Vegas, Nevada, United States
| 
|-
| Win
| align=center| 8–2
| Steve Berger
| KO (punches)
| KOTC: Bad Boys II
| 
| align=center| 1
| align=center| 2:18
| Detroit, Michigan, United States
| 
|-
| Win
| align=center| 7–2
| Chris Barnes
| TKO (punches)
| 5150 Combat League/XFL: New Year's Revolution
| 
| align=center| 1
| align=center| 1:12
| Tulsa, Oklahoma, United States
| 
|-
| Win
| align=center| 6–2
| Frank Caraballo
| Decision (unanimous)
| Bellator 5
| 
| align=center| 3
| align=center| 5:00
| Dayton, Ohio, United States
| 
|-
| Win
| align=center| 5–2
| Jay Ellis
| Decision (unanimous)
| Extreme Challenge 109
| 
| align=center| 3
| align=center| 5:00
| Moline, Illinois, United States
| 
|-
| Win
| align=center| 4–2
| Alex Carter
| Submission (rear-naked choke)
| International Combat Event 32
| 
| align=center| 1
| align=center| 3:06
| Cincinnati, Ohio, United States
| 
|-
| Win
| align=center| 3–2
| Andrew Hoogeboom
| TKO (punches)
| Xtreme Fighting Organization 22
| 
| align=center| 1
| align=center| 0:43
| Crystal Lake, Illinois, United States
| 
|-
| Loss
| align=center| 2–2
| Alonzo Martinez
| TKO (submission to punches)
| Fightfest: Season 1 Finale
| 
| align=center| 1
| align=center| 3:07
| Canton, Ohio, United States
| 
|-
| Win
| align=center| 2–1
| Nick Sorg
| TKO (submission to punches)
| Fightfest 10
| 
| align=center| 2
| align=center| 1:59
| Canton, Ohio, United States
| 
|-
| Win
| align=center| 1–1
| Cody Shipp
| Submission (kimura)
| Fightfest 7: Battle of the Titans
| 
| align=center| 2
| align=center| 2:23
| Cleveland, Ohio, United States
| 
|-
| Loss
| align=center| 0–1
| David Love
| Submission (guillotine choke)
| HOOKnSHOOT: Midwest
| 
| align=center| 1
| align=center| 1:00
| Evansville, Indiana, United States
|

See also
List of male mixed martial artists
List of Bellator MMA alumni

References

External links

1980 births
Living people
American male mixed martial artists
Mixed martial artists from Tennessee
Lightweight mixed martial artists
Mixed martial artists utilizing collegiate wrestling
People from Coconut Creek, Florida
People from Jefferson City, Tennessee
Ultimate Fighting Championship male fighters
American male sport wrestlers
Findlay Oilers
College wrestlers in the United States
People from Dandridge, Tennessee